The Abia State Ministry of Health is the ministerial body of the Abia State Government charged with the responsibility of implementing government policy on health by providing information, raising health awareness and education, ensuring the accessibility of health services, and
monitoring the quality of health services provided to citizens and
visitors in Abia State.

See also
Abia State Government

References

Government ministries of Abia State
Abia